The Fabric Synagogue is a Neolog synagogue in the Fabric district of Timișoara. The synagogue was called the New Synagogue because it replaced the old synagogue on Timocului Street. It was built between 1897 and 1899 in an eclectic style, with neo-Moorish, Gothic and Italian neo-Renaissance elements.

History 

The year of the foundation of the first synagogue on this site is disputed. Some opinions date it to 1838, others to 1841. The temple was first opened for a Jewish community that, after 1870, joined the so-called status quo ante trend of Hungarian and Transylvanian Judaism. A dozen years later, this community became Neolog. It was located on Kunz Embankment, on the banks of the Bega Canal, next to the Archduke's House, built after 1868, and the Josef Kunz Palace (1892), which were "the symbolic monumental gateway to the Fabric district".

The Fabric Synagogue was built according to a project by the Hungarian architect Lipót Baumhorn, who designed, among other things, the Neolog synagogues in Brașov and Szeged. The new building was designed according to the tradition of the great contemporary Neolog synagogues of the Austro-Hungarian Empire, it is similar in shape to the synagogues in Rijeka, Szolnok and Zrenjanin, built according to the plans of the same architect. Delighted by the plan, the Jews of Fabric formed a temple construction committee, chaired by David Blau, a spirit maker. Sándor Kohn, the sales representative and lawyer of the brick company Kunz and Partners, and Miksa Steiner, the owner of a lye factory, also played a major role. It is interesting that part of the financing of the construction was covered by a lottery organized by the City Hall. The work was entrusted to the Timișoara entrepreneur Josef Kremer. The synagogue was inaugurated on 3 September 1899, with a sermon by Rabbi Jakab Singer, in the presence of the head of the community, Bernát Deutsch, and the mayor of Timisoara, Carol Telbisz. The organ was built by the famous Timișoara craftsman .

During the war years, after the confiscation of the school premises, the courses of the Israelite High School continued, for a time, inside the synagogue. The synagogue fell into decay at the end of the communist period, closing in 1985 as most of the Jews left in the city after World War II emigrated to Israel. It was closed for 24 years, during which time it was vandalized several times and several valuables, such as sculptures or pieces of furniture, were stolen. In 2009, the Jewish community ceded the Fabric Synagogue to the Timișoara National Theater. The management of the cultural institution planned to renovate the building and set up a performance hall in five years. Since nothing has changed, Timișoara City Hall decided to take over its administration in 2018 in order to turn it into a multicultural center.

Architecture 
Fabric Synagogue is one of the most beautiful buildings in Timișoara, notable for its very rich decorative ensemble. Its plan is square, with a central dome that connects to the outer walls through semicircular arches. The central dome rests on an octagonal tambour, made of plastered and painted wood. The building also stands out through its small domes and towers, and on the polychrome facades the plaster alternates with the apparent red-yellow brick (Klinkersteine).

The Fabric Synagogue features neo-Moorish elements combined with Gothic and neo-Renaissance elements. The height of the building is marked by the adjoining columns, and the upper part is provided with decorative railings. The building has two entrances, one for women and one for men. The one for women is on the street, and from it one can get upstairs. Upstairs is also the organ. The men have the entrance through a vestibule (pulish), and from here they reach the room reserved for them (heichal), where there are several wooden benches.

References

External links 
 Virtual tour of the synagogue

See also 

 List of synagogues in Romania
 Cetate Synagogue
 Iosefin Synagogue

Neolog Judaism synagogues
Synagogues in Timișoara
Moorish Revival architecture in Romania
Moorish Revival synagogues
Historic monuments in Timiș County